General elections were held in Palau on 3 November 2020 to elect a President and the National Congress.

Electoral system
The President of Palau is elected using the two-round system.

The 13 members of the Senate are elected from a single nationwide constituency by block voting, with each voter having 13 votes to cast. The 16 members of the House of Delegates are elected in single-member constituencies based on the states using first-past-the-post voting.

Results

President
The primary round was held on 22 September 2020 with four candidates. The incumbent president, Thomas Remengesau Jr., was ineligible to stand again having reached his term limit. Former presidential candidate (and brother-in-law of the incumbent) Surangel Whipps Jr. took first place in the primary, while Vice President Raynold Oilouch placed second to qualify for the second round of the presidential election.

Following the second round on 3 November, Oilouch conceded defeat to Whipps on 5 November after all the votes from Palau had been counted, giving Whipps a 1,202 vote lead with around 2,000 absentee votes still to be counted. The Palau Election Commission officially certified the final results on 17 November.

Vice president

Senate

Elected members
Mason Whipps
Steven Kuartei
Andrew Tabelual
Mark Rudimch
Rukebai Kikuo Inabo
Hokkons Baules
K. Topps Sungino
TJ Remengesau
Umiich Sengebau
Jonathan Isechal
Kerai Mariur
Secilil Eldebechel
Regis Akitaya (died in 2022, succeeded by Salvador Tellames)

House of Delegates

References

Palau
General election
Election and referendum articles with incomplete results
Elections in Palau
Non-partisan elections
November 2020 events in Oceania
Presidential elections in Palau